Good Evening, Mr. Wallenberg is a 1990 film about Swedish World War II diplomat Raoul Wallenberg, who was instrumental in saving the lives of thousands of Hungarian Jews from the Holocaust. He is played by Stellan Skarsgård.

The film won four awards at the 26th Guldbagge Awards: Best Film (Katinka Faragó), Best Direction (Kjell Grede), Best Screenplay (Kjell Grede), and Best Cinematography (Esa Vuorinen). It was also entered into the 41st Berlin International Film Festival. The film was selected as the Swedish entry for the Best Foreign Language Film at the 63rd Academy Awards, but was not accepted as a nominee.

Cast
Stellan Skarsgård as Raoul Wallenberg
Katharina Thalbach as Mária
Károly Eperjes as László Szamosi
Miklós Székely B. as Ferenc Moser
Erland Josephson as Rabbi
Franciszek Pieczka as Papa
Jesper Christensen as Officer at Watteau
Ivan Desny as General Schmidthuber (a portrayal of real-life Pál Szalai)
Géza Balkay as Gábor Vajna
Percy Brandt as Swedish Ambassador
Tamás Jordán as member of the Jewish Council
Andor Lukáts as  Father at the train 
Gábor Reviczky as Officer at the Gate
László Soós as Adolf Eichmann
Franciska Györy as Júlia
Zsuzsa Szabó as Lilith
László Csákányi as Gimpel
István Mészáros as Pál

See also
 List of submissions to the 63rd Academy Awards for Best Foreign Language Film
 List of Swedish submissions for the Academy Award for Best Foreign Language Film

References

External links
 
 
 
 

1990 films
1990s Swedish-language films
Swedish biographical films
Holocaust films
Cultural depictions of Raoul Wallenberg
Cultural depictions of Adolf Eichmann
Films shot in Hungary
Films directed by Kjell Grede
Best Film Guldbagge Award winners
Films whose director won the Best Director Guldbagge Award
1990s biographical films
1990s Swedish films